The Crossing is a 2012 studio album by American singer Sophie B. Hawkins.

Reception
Jon O'Brien of AllMusic gave the album a mixed review with the site editors giving it three of five stars. He praised the album's diverse songwriting but criticizes the release for losing its way and ultimately being "just too ordinary to be the career-reviver she needs".

Track listing
All songs written by Sophie B. Hawkins except where indicated
"Betchya Gotta Cure" – 3:21
"Sinnerman" – 3:03 (Will Holt)
"The Land the Sea and the Sky" – 4:15
"Georgia" – 3:58
"Missing" – 3:06
"Heart & Soul of a Woman" – 4:02
"Life Is a River" – 4:40
"I Dont Need You" – 3:00
"Miles Away" – 5:26
"Gone Baby" – 6:00
"A Child" – 3:51
"Dream St & Chance" – 3:47
"Red Bird" – 4:34
"Betchya Gotta Cure" (Long) – 4:13
"Damn I Wish I Was Your Lover" (Acoustic) – 4:40
"As I Lay Me Down" (Acoustic) – 3:26
"Missing" (Original Demo) – 3:30

Personnel
Sophie B. Hawkins – arrangement, drums, engineering, percussion, piano, production, strings, vocals

Additional musicians
Jimmy Paxson – drums
Paul Pesco – guitar
Tim Pierce – guitar
David Piltch – bass guitar
Kaveh Rastegar – bass guitar
Ed Roth – piano
Mary Steenburgen – composer
Lee Thornburg – horn, horn arrangement
Graham Ward – drums
Tim Young – guitar

Technical personnel
Mark DeSisto – mixing
Alexandria Dobson – vocal production
Larrance Dopson – production
Kevin Killen – mixing

References

External links

2012 albums
Lightyear Entertainment albums
Sophie B. Hawkins albums